Padishah (from Persian:  [or Old Persian: *], 'master', and shāh, 'king'), sometimes romanised as padeshah, padshah or badshah, is a superlative sovereign title of Persian origin.

A form of the word is known already from Middle Persian, or Pahlavi language, as pātaxšā(h) or pādixšā(y). Middle Persian pād may stem from Avestan paiti, and is akin to Pati (title). Xšāy, "to rule", and xšāyaθiya, "king", are from Old Persian.

It was adopted by several monarchs claiming the highest rank, roughly equivalent to the ancient Persian notion of "Great King", and later adopted by post-Achaemenid and the Mughal emperors of India. However, in some periods it was used more generally for autonomous Muslim rulers, as in the Hudud al-'Alam of the 10th century, where even some petty princes of Afghanistan are called pādshā(h)/pādshāʼi/pādshāy.

The rulers on the following thrones – the first two effectively commanding major West Asian empires – were styled Padishah:

 The Shahanshah of Iran, originating mainly with the Safavids
 The Padishah of the Ottoman Empire
The Badshah of the Mughal Empire
 Mongol Ilkhan Ghazan took the title Padshah-i Islam after he converted to Islam in 1295, possibly in order to undermine the religious prestige of the Mamluk Sultanate in Egypt. The title Ilkhan, that came into use c. 1259–1265, may be an equivalent of Padishah, if it is taken to mean  "sovereign khan" (and not "subordinate khan" as often posited).
 Miangul Golshahzada Abdul Wadud (predecessor styled Amir-i shariat, successors [Khān and] Wali) of the Pakistani North-West Frontier state of Swat, who called himself badshah from November 1918 to March 1926.
 Ahmad Shah Durrani, who founded the Durrani Empire in 1747 with the title Pādshah-i Afghanistan in Persian and Badcha Da Afghanistan in the Pashto language. The Sadduzai were overthrown in 1823 but there was a brief restoration by Shah Shujah in 1839 with the help of British India & Ranjit Singh and the Sikh Empire. The title became dormant from his assassination in 1842 until 1926 when Amanullah Khan resurrected it (official from 1937) and was finally laid to rest with the abdication of Mohammed Zahir Shah in 1973 following a coup; at other times the Afghan monarchy used the style Emir (Amir al-Momenin) or Malik ("King").
 The last Basha bey of Tunisia, Muhammad VIII al-Amin (proclaimed bey on 15 May 1943), adopted the sovereign style padshah 20 March 1956 – 25 July 1957.

The compound Pādshah-i-Ghazi ("Victorious Emperor") is only recorded for two individual rulers:

 Ahmad Shah Durrani, Emperor of the Durrani Empire
 Rustam-i-Dauran, Aristu-i-Zaman,  Asaf Jah IV, Muzaffar ul-Mamaluk, Nizam ul-Mulk, Nizam ud-Daula, Nawab Mir Farkhunda 'Ali Khan Bahadur [Gufran Manzil], Sipah Salar, Fath Jang, Ayn waffadar Fidvi-i-Senliena, Iqtidar-i-Kishwarsitan Muhammad Akbar Shah Padshah-i-Ghazi, Nizam of Hyderabad

The Sikhs usе the term Patishahi for the 10 gurus. Badshah is also used for the 10th and last Guru of Sikhs Guru Gobind Singh.

Badshah is a Central Asian title used for Dahiya clan of Jats in North India. Dahiya Jats called Dahiya Badshah in Northern India. Dahiya Jats were King Emperors and ruled over Iran near Caspian Sea. Dahiya or Dahae had their empire and kingdom in Central Asia that's why they are called Dahiya Badshah.

Note that like many titles, the word Padishah was also often used as a name, either by nobles with other (in this case always lower) styles, or even by commoners.

Ottoman Empire

In the Ottoman Empire the title padishah was exclusively reserved for the Ottoman emperor, as the Ottoman chancery rarely and unwillingly addressed foreign monarchs as padishahs. The Habsburg emperors were consequently denied this title and addressed merely as the "kings of Vienna" (beç kıralı). With the Peace of Zsitvatorok in 1606, it was the first time that the Sublime Porte recognized Rudolf II as equal of the padishah. The Treaty of Küçük Kaynarca in 1774, gave similar concessions to the Russian Empire.

In Ottoman sources
According to Ahmedi's İskendernâme, one of the earliest Ottoman sources, alongside the titles sultan and beg, Orhan and Murad I bore the title padishah as well.

See also

 Baig
 Begum
 Nawab

References

External links 
 

Heads of state
Monarchy
Noble titles
Ottoman titles
Persian words and phrases
Titles in Afghanistan
Titles in Iran
Titles in Pakistan
Titles of national or ethnic leadership